

Definition
A dynamic manufacturing network (DMN) is a coalition, either permanent or temporal, comprising production systems of geographically dispersed small and medium enterprises and/or original equipment manufacturers that collaborate in a shared value-chain to conduct joint manufacturing.

The dynamic manufacturing networks are an approach that helps to manage risks and increase benefits in the manufacturing sector. The DMNs are a proposed solution to increase the efficiency and reduce the time needed to design and operate a new manufacturing network, or to reconfigure an existing one.

Applications

Manufacturing networks have become increasingly common in applied research on manufacturing, since several manufacturing enterprises have shown interest for creating such networks and take advantage of them both for collaborative product development and for supply chain optimization.

During the last decade the effort is mainly focused on the dynamic management of the manufacturing networks, as proven by several studies published by Accenture, MIT
 and University of St. Gallen

References 

Manufacturing